Pseudocalliergon trifarium, the three-ranked spear-moss, is a species of moss belonging to the family Amblystegiaceae.

It has almost cosmopolitan distribution.

Taxonomy

Synonyms
Calliergon trifarium (F.Weber & D.Mohr) Kindb.

References

Amblystegiaceae